David Patrick Crane (born 1953 in Nappanee, Indiana, United States) is an American video game designer and programmer.

Crane originally worked in the field of hardware design for National Semiconductor. He went to college at DeVry Institute of Technology in Phoenix, Arizona and graduated with a Bachelor of Science in Electrical Engineering Technology degree in 1975. Crane started his programming career at Atari, making games for the Atari 2600. He also worked on the operating system for the Atari 800 computer. After meeting co-worker Alan Miller in a tennis game, Miller told Crane about a plan he had to leave Atari and found a company that would give game designers more recognition. From this meeting, Crane left Atari in 1979 and co-founded Activision, along with Miller, Jim Levy, Bob Whitehead, and Larry Kaplan. His games won many awards while he was at Activision. At Activision, he was best known as the designer of Pitfall!. Pitfall! was a huge hit; it maintained the top slot on the Billboard charts for 64 weeks and was named video game of the year in 1982.  Over four million copies of the game were sold in the 1980s.  It was the second best-selling game for the Atari 2600 after Pac-Man.

Crane maintained that the Atari policy of relying on mangled adaptations of arcade games would result in a glut of cheap, unappealing games, which became one of the contributing factors to the video game crash of 1983. He believed instead that tailoring new games to the strengths and weaknesses of the 2600 machine would have yielded positive results. The reasoning was that while the new games would have lacked the instant-promotion of an already-known name, word of mouth among video gamers, being a young and highly-social group, would have gradually made up for it if the game was good.

Crane said that he left because the newly appointed CEO of Activision, Bruce Davis, offered a pay cut with the promise of a vaguely worded incentive program. Although Absolute was based in New Jersey, Crane did all of his programming at his home in California. With Absolute, he was known for David Crane's Amazing Tennis and A Boy and His Blob: Trouble on Blobolonia, a successful NES title following the adventures of the protagonist and his companion, a shape-shifting blob creature.  In 1995, Absolute Entertainment was dissolved.

In 1995, Crane co-founded Skyworks Technologies as the organization's Chief Technical Officer.

In 2012, Crane launched a Kickstarter campaign to fund a game called Jungle Adventure. The goal was not reached.

Crane, along with Garry Kitchen and his brother Dan, founded Audacity Games in November 2020 to develop Atari 2600 games to be played on retro consoles. They plan to release these games as both physical copies alongside digital versions that are emulator-friendly. The first title, Circus Convoy, a collaboration between Crane and Garry Kitchen, went on sale March 13, 2021.

Games

References

External links

 Legends of the C64 article on David Crane and Activision
 Meet David Crane: Video Games Guru magazine interview from 1983
 The Dot Eaters article  featuring Crane, Pitfall! and Activision, retrieved December 2013
 "Playing Catch-Up: 'A Boy And His Job: Activision's David Crane'", interview with Crane on Gamasutra
David Crane at IMDB
David Crane at RAWG

1953 births
Activision
American video game designers
Atari people
Living people
People from Nappanee, Indiana
Video game programmers
Academy of Interactive Arts & Sciences Pioneer Award recipients
Game Developers Conference Pioneer Award recipients